Ivan Vladimirovich Tsvetaev (16 May [O. S. 4 May] 1847, Shuya, Ivanovo Oblast – 12 September 1913, Moscow) was a Russian art historian, archaeologist and Classical philologist.

Biography 
Tsvetaev's father, Vladimir Vasilyevich Tsvetaev (1818–1884) was a village priest. After the early death of his mother in 1859, his father raised him and his three brothers for a life in the priesthood, sending them to the religious school in Shuya, then to the seminary in Vladimir. He also studied briefly at the Imperial Medical and Surgical Academy, but quit, citing poor health, and enrolled at Saint Petersburg State University instead; following a course in Classical Studies and graduating in 1870 as a "Candidate in the Sciences".

The following year, he became a teacher of Classical Greek Studies at a gymnasium in Saint Petersburg. This only lasted a short time as, in 1872, he was appointed a lecturer at the Imperial University of Warsaw, where he presented a dissertation on Tacitus to obtain his habilitation in 1873.

In 1874, he travelled to Italy to study the ancient Italic languages and writings. In 1876, he was called to the Saint Vladimir Royal University of Kiev, but only a year later was presented with a position at the Moscow State University as a candidate for the Chair of the Latin literature department.

He married , an opera singer. Under her influence, he gradually switched his interests from Classical philology to antiquities. After 1881, he worked at the Rumyantsev Museum, serving as its Director from 1900 to 1910. In 1888, he was named an honorary faculty member at the University of Bologna. By the following year, he had made a part-time return to the academic world as the Chair of Art History and Theory at Moscow University. They had two daughters; Marina and Anastasia, both of whom became well-known poets and writers.

In 1894, at the "First Congress of Artists and Art Lovers", he presented plans for a new museum of fine arts, inspired by a visit to the Albertinum in Dresden, where he became lifelong friends with Georg Treu, the head of its world-famous Skulpturensammlung. A design competition was organized and the award went to Roman Klein. In 1897, Tsvetaev was able to secure the wealthy glassware manufacturer, Yury Nechaev-Maltsov, as the museum's primary sponsor. The cornerstone was laid in 1899 and the museum was officially opened in 1912. Tsvetaev served as its first Director until his death a year later. Originally the "Alexander III Museum of Fine Arts", it is now known as the Pushkin Museum.

References

External links 

 Tsvetayev, Ivan (1847–1913), art historian, linguist. In: Oxford index.
 Ivanovo region official tourism portal: Tsvetayev
 Karina Subarova: Alexei Smirnov: Ivan Tsvetaev – Realization of a Childhood Dream (St. Petersburg 2013). In: Literaturnaya Gazeta. 2013 Nr. 45 (13. November 2013)
 Rodovid: Ivan Vladimirovich Tsvetaev. (Russian)
 Tsvetaev, Ivan Vladimirovich. Rumyantsev Museum, Russian State Library 2011 (Russian)

1847 births
1913 deaths
Russian art historians
Russian philologists
Russian archaeologists
Pushkin Museum